Ryan McGrath an American former professional and collegiate football player. Collegiately he was a standout player at The Ohio University, and played professionally for the Omaha Mammoths of the FXFL. He played in the inaugural season for the team based in Omaha, Nebraska. McGrath also played in the 2014 NFLPA Collegiate Bowl, All Star Game in Carson, California.

While at Ohio he had 29 career starts at right offensive tackle.

References

External links
Ryan McGrath bio at Ohio Bobcats football

American football offensive tackles
Living people
Ohio Bobcats football players
Omaha Mammoths players
Players of American football from Pennsylvania
Year of birth missing (living people)